Agaricus xanthodermus, commonly known as the yellow-staining mushroom or simply the yellow-stainer, is a mushroom of the
genus Agaricus, which displays a strong yellow colouration at the base of the stem when cut. It is poisonous for most people, causing gastrointestinal upset, but can be eaten by some without apparent negative effect.

Taxonomy
This species was first officially defined under the name Agaricus xanthodermus in 1876 by Léon Gaston Genevier, in a letter published in the bulletin of the French Botanical Society.  Genevier described the Agaricus mushrooms commonly eaten (perhaps sometimes inadvisedly) in the region of Nantes, and attempted to clarify the distinctions between them. He proposed a detailed reclassification into 5 species, including this new one. Apparently up until that time, these yellow-staining mushrooms were considered to be just varieties of other species which are edible: A. arvensis, A. edulis, and A. silvicola.

The epithet xanthodermus is derived from the Ancient Greek words for "yellow" and "skin", which were then given a Latin adjective ending. This is the official name, but the form Agaricus xanthoderma is also often seen.  In the latter name, -derma "skin" is a neuter noun which does not have to agree in gender with Agaricus, and so this form is legal according to the rules of botanical nomenclature.

Description

It is initially convex, with some young specimens having a squarish shape, though flattening with age. It is whitish, with light brown tints towards the centre. The cap is dry and smooth, but can be scaly when old. The gills of this mushroom progress from pale-pink to a chocolate color. Microscopically, the cheilocystidia are club-shaped. The spores are brown, elliptical, and smooth, measuring 6–7 × 3–4 µm.

The main identifying feature is an immediate bright yellow colouration on cutting through the base of the stem, or scraping the flesh; later, the affected area fades to a dull brown. Numerous edible Agaricus species, such as A. augustus, A. arvensis and A. silvicola, turn yellow to a greater or lesser extent, but they do not display such an intense reaction.

Agaricus xanthodermus has an unpleasant characteristic smell, which is phenolic, reminiscent of ink or carbolic soap. The smell is especially strong at the base of the stem.

Distribution and habitat

This mushroom is very common and widely distributed in North America, Europe, West Asia including eastern Anatolia and Iran, North Africa, and southern Africa.  It has been introduced into Australia. It occurs in woods, lawns, gardens and hedgerows in autumn. This is a saprobic species.

Toxicity
Although it appears that some people can eat this mushroom without ill effects, it contains toxins which can cause serious gastric problems. It is indigestible and gives rise to symptoms of sweating, flushing, and severe stomach cramps.

Of those who gather Agaricus-style mushrooms, about 50% of the cases of poisoning are from this species. On cooking, the smell becomes very noticeable, and this may deter people from eating it inadvertently.

Related species
Agaricus xanthodermus belongs to a group of related species  (the "Xanthodermati") which likewise discolour bright yellow and have a phenolic smell. They include A. praeclaresquamosus (formerly A. placomyces) which has dark grey scales, A. moelleri, and A. pilatianus, which does not have a bulbous stem.

Agaricus californicus is also similar in appearance.

See also
 List of Agaricus species

References

 Collins Gem Guide: Mushrooms and Toadstools, Stefan Buckzacki (1982).
 
 

xanthodermus
Fungi described in 1876
Fungi of Europe
Fungi of North America
Poisonous fungi